The Dacian fortress of Sânzieni was a Dacian fortified town. It was located in the town of Sânzieni, Romania.

References

Dacian fortresses in Covasna County
Historic monuments in Covasna County